Amelas was a town in ancient Lycia. Coins were minted there, some of which are in the British Museum. The location of Amelas is in doubt.

References

Populated places in ancient Lycia
Lost ancient cities and towns
Former populated places in Turkey